U-Tapao–Rayong–Pattaya International Airport   also spelled Utapao and U-Taphao, is a joint civil–military public airport serving Rayong and Pattaya cities in Thailand. It is in Ban Chang District of Rayong Province.

It also serves as the U-Tapao Royal Thai Navy Airfield, home of the Royal Thai Navy First Air Wing. U-Tapao is the home of a large Thai Airways maintenance facility, servicing that airline's aircraft as well as those of other customers. Due to the blockade of Bangkok's airports by opposition protesters, U-Tapao briefly became the main air gateway to Thailand between 26 November and 5 December 2008.  As both of Bangkok's international airports essential to the country's tourist boom are operating beyond capacity as of 2015, U-Tapao in particular has been eyed as an alternate international gateway due to its relative proximity to the capital.

Location

History

Vietnam War

U-Tapao was built by the United States to accommodate B-52 bombers for missions in Vietnam, Laos, and Cambodia during the Vietnam War. Construction began on 15 October 1965 and was completed on 2 June 1966. U-Tapao was the primary Southeast Asian airfield for US Air Force B-52 Stratofortress bombers, called "Bee-hasip-sawng" (B-52) by the local Thais. U-Tapao was a front-line base along with the other US bases at Korat, Udon, Ubon, Nakhon Phanom, and Takhli. The USAF B-52s made regular sorties over North Vietnam and North Vietnamese-controlled areas in Laos, carrying an average of 108 500-pound and 750-pound bombs per mission. U-Tapao was a regular stop on Bob Hope's Christmas shows for the troops.

November 2008 protests in Bangkok
With the temporary closure of Suvarnabhumi Airport and Don Mueang Airport in late November 2008 because they had been occupied by anti-government protestors, U-Tapao became for a time Thailand's main supplementary international gateway. Many airlines arranged special flights to and from U-Tapao to ferry international passengers stranded by the closure of the Suvarnabhumi Airport. Several governments including Italy, Macau and Spain also sent chartered flights to evacuate residents.

As many as 100,000 passengers were stranded in Thailand until early December. Although its runway can accommodate large aircraft, U-Tapao's terminals are not designed to handle more than a few flights a day. Travellers were subject to many hardships, and as the security was not up-to-date, some US-bound flights were diverted to Japan and their passengers required to go through a supplementary security check before continuing.

Airport expansion
As Bangkok's two international airports are operating beyond capacity, the government intends to turn U-Tapao into a third major destination for airlines. A new second terminal will increase airport capacity from 800,000 to three million persons per year. Terminal 2 was partially opened in November 2018 and was officially opened in February 2019.

There were also 41 direct flights landing from China weekly. Airport director, Rear Admiral Worapol Tongpricha, said the 620 million baht terminal is the start of a three-year, first-phase development. In the second phase, the government will boost the capacity further to 15 million passengers per year.

In November 2022, the Thai Government approved another expansion plan for U-Tapao, to increase its capacity to 60 million passengers per year. It is planned to add a new runway, taxiways and facilities to increase Pattaya's and Bangkok's air passenger capacity, and also boost connections to the Eastern Economic Corridor.

Concessions
In late-2018, King Power was awarded a ten-year contract to operate U-Tapao duty-free shops. A partnership between Thai retailer Central Department Store Company (Central Group) and DFS Group will manage retail shops and services, mainly food and beverage, also for 10 years.

Airlines and destinations

Accidents and incidents
 On 28 October 1977, a Douglas DC-3 of Vietnam Airlines en route from Tan Son Nhat International Airport, Ho Chi Minh City, to Duong Dong Airport, Phu Quoc, Vietnam, was hijacked and diverted to U-Tapao Air Base to refuel. Two Vietnamese officials on the aircraft were killed in the hijacking.

References

External links 

 U-Taphao Airport
 Pattaya Airport Guide ( passenger information and real time flight arrivals / departures )
 
 

Airports in Thailand
Rayong province
1966 establishments in Thailand
Airports established in 1966